Courts of Vermont include:
;State courts of Vermont
Vermont Supreme Court
Vermont Superior Court
Civil Division
Criminal Division
Environmental Division
Family Division
Probate Division
Vermont Judicial Bureau

Federal courts located in Vermont
United States District Court for the District of Vermont

See also
Judiciary of Vermont

References

External links
National Center for State Courts – directory of state court websites.

Courts in the United States